Firdaus Idros is a Singaporean footballer who plays as a winger for S.League side Tampines Rovers FC.

Career

Tampines Rovers
Firdaus signed for the Stags for the 2015 S.League season.

References 

Living people
1986 births
Singaporean footballers
Singapore international footballers
Young Lions FC players
Home United FC players
Tanjong Pagar United FC players
Tampines Rovers FC players
Association football midfielders
Singapore Premier League players
Southeast Asian Games bronze medalists for Singapore
Southeast Asian Games medalists in football
Competitors at the 2009 Southeast Asian Games